The River End is a name given to one end of many sports stadia. It may refer to:

 River End at the Adelaide Oval
 River End at the Bellerive Oval
 River End at Carrow Road
 River End at the County Cricket Ground, Chelmsford
 River End at the County Ground, Taunton
 River End at the Himachal Pradesh Cricket Association Stadium
 River End at the National Cricket Stadium, Grenada
 Hennops River End at SuperSport Park
 River Taff End at Sophia Gardens
 River End at Windsor Park, Dominica